14 teams participated in the 1998–99 Egyptian Premier League season. The first team in the league was the champion, and qualified to champions league 1999 along with the team finishing in second place. Third placed team qualified to confederation cup. Finally, the last three in the league will play next season in the second division.

League table

References

1998–99 in African association football leagues
0
Premier